The Sarasaviya Best Film Award is presented annually in Sri Lanka by the weekly Sarasaviya newspaper in collaboration with the Associated Newspapers of Ceylon Limited at the Sarasaviya Awards Festival for the best Sri Lankan movie of the year.
The award was first given in 1964. Following is a list of the winners of this prestigious title since then.

References

Film
Awards for best film
Awards established in 1964
1964 establishments in Ceylon